Syeda Saira Mohsin (born 10 September 1965) is a Bangladesh Awami League politician and former Member of Parliament in Bangladesh.

Career
Mohsin was nominated by Bangladesh Awami League to contest the by-election to Moulvibazar-3 constituency in Rajnagar Upazila and Moulvibazar Sadar Upazila of Moulvibazar District. The seat had fallen vacant after the death of her husband, Syed Mohsin Ali, on 14 September 2015. The nomination was approved by Prime Minister Sheikh Hasina. She won the election uncontested after Bangladesh Election Commission scrapped the candidacy of all her opponents. She was sworn into office by the Speaker of the Parliament Shirin Sharmin Chaudhury on 7 December 2015.

Personal life
Mohsin was married to Bangladesh Awami League politician Syed Mohsin Ali. Her husband was the Minister of Social Welfare. Her husband died on 14 September 2015. In 2017, she received the Independence Day Award on behalf of her late husband who received it posthumously for his role in the Bangladesh Liberation war.

References

Living people
1965 births
People from Moulvibazar District
Awami League politicians
Women members of the Jatiya Sangsad
10th Jatiya Sangsad members
Place of birth missing (living people)
Bangladeshi people of Arab descent
21st-century Bangladeshi women politicians